Wen Zhenheng (1585–1645) was a Ming dynasty scholar, painter, landscape garden designer, and great grandson of Wen Zhengming, a famous Ming dynasty painter.

Wen was born in Suzhou in 1585. In 1621, he graduated from the Imperial Academy, obtained the lowest degree of zhusheng. In 1637, Wen was the assistant magistrate of Longzhou county in the Shanxi prefecture. On the same year, he was appointed Secretariat Drafter by Chongzhen Emperor. Wen Zhenheng was famous for his calligraphy, poetry and essays. He was also an expert in landscape garden design, the Sweetgrass Garden he built in Suzhou was famous at his time.

Treatise on Superfluous Things

Wen Zhenheng's best known work  Zhang Wu Zhi (traditional: 長物志, simplified:长物志, "Treatise on Superfluous Things") written between 1620-1627 was an encyclopedic book about garden architecture and interior design.

Zhang Wu Zhi was divided into twelve volumes:

  Vol 1. House and Dwelling—17 chapters
  Vol 2. Flowers and Trees—43 chapters
  Vol 3. Water and Stones - 18 chapters
  Vol 4. Fowl and Fish—11 chapters
  Vol 5. Books and Paintings - 26 chapters
  Vol 6. Chairs and Beds—20 chapters
  Vol 7. Utensils—58 chapters
  Vol 8. Cloths and accessories—10 chapters
  Vol 9. Boat and carriage—4 chapters
  Vol 10. Arrangement—11 chapters
  Vol 11. Vegetable and Fruits—27 chapters
  Vol 12. Incense and Tea—24 chapters(Wen Zhenheng on Tea)

References  

An excellent edition, with detailed annotations, abundant pictures and photographs of various objects discussed in the book.
There is no complete translation of this book in any other language. Some sections were translated in the Clunas book above and in some books on gardening and furniture.

Craig Clunas discusses several Ming dynasty scholars, including  Gao Lian, Tu Long in addition to Wen Zhenheng. He has translated the first chapter of each of the twelve volumes and there is a detailed biography of Wen Zhenheng on pages 20 to 25.

External links 
 Zhang Wu Zhi-- Treatise on Superfluous Things, Chapter 12, Incense and Tea 

Ming dynasty calligraphers
Ming dynasty painters
Ming dynasty poets
Chinese scholars
Landscape or garden designers
1645 deaths
1585 births
Suicides in the Qing dynasty
Suicides by starvation
Painters from Suzhou
Writers from Suzhou
Poets from Jiangsu
Ming dynasty politicians
Politicians from Suzhou
17th-century Chinese calligraphers
Ming dynasty people